One Hundred and One Dalmatians (also simply known as 101 Dalmatians) is a 1961 American animated adventure comedy film produced by Walt Disney Productions and based on the 1956 novel The Hundred and One Dalmatians by Dodie Smith. The 17th Disney animated feature film, it was directed by Hamilton Luske, Clyde Geronimi and Wolfgang Reitherman and written by Bill Peet, and features the voices of Rod Taylor, Cate Bauer, Betty Lou Gerson, Ben Wright, Lisa Davis, and Martha Wentworth. The film's plot follows a litter of Dalmatian puppies who are kidnapped by the villainous Cruella de Vil ("deVille"), who wants to make their fur into coats. Their parents, Pongo and Perdita, set out to save their puppies from Cruella, in the process of rescuing 84 additional ones that were bought in pet shops, bringing the total of Dalmatians to 101.

The film was originally released in theaters on January 25, 1961, and was a box office success, pulling the studio out of the financial slump caused by Sleeping Beauty, a costlier production released two years prior, and became the eighth-highest-grossing film of the year in the North American box office. Aside from its box-office revenue, the employment of inexpensive animation techniques—such as using xerography during the process of inking and painting traditional animation cels—kept production costs down. Disney later released a live-action remake titled 101 Dalmatians in 1996 and its sequel 102 Dalmatians in 2000. A direct-to-video animated sequel to the 1961 film titled 101 Dalmatians II: Patch's London Adventure was released in 2003. A live-action reboot titled Cruella directed by Craig Gillespie was released on May 28, 2021, in theaters and on Disney+ with Premier Access simultaneously.

Plot

Aspiring songwriter Roger Radcliffe lives in London, in a bachelor flat with his pet dalmatian, Pongo. Deciding both of them need a "mate", Pongo watches women and their dogs in the street. Noticing Anita and her Dalmatian Perdita, he drags Roger to the park to arrange a meeting. Roger and Anita fall in love, and soon marry, with Pongo and Perdita attending.

The pair hires a nanny and moves to a small townhouse near Regent's Park. After Perdita becomes pregnant with a litter of 15 puppies, Anita's fur-obsessed former schoolmate, Cruella de Vil, arrives and demands to know when the puppies will arrive. Roger responds by writing a jazzy song mocking her. When the puppies are born, Cruella returns, demanding to buy them. Roger firmly denies her request; Cruella swears revenge, and storms out.

A few months later, Cruella hires brothers Horace and Jasper Baddun, two burglars, to steal the puppies. When Scotland Yard is unable to find the puppies, Pongo and Perdita use the "Twilight Bark", a canine gossip line, to solicit help from the other dogs in London.

Colonel, an old English sheepdog, along with his compatriot Sergeant Tibbs, a tabby cat, investigate the nearby "Old De Vil Place", where puppies had been heard barking two nights earlier. Tibbs learns they are going to be made into dog-skin fur coats, after which Colonel sends word back to London. Pongo and Perdita leave through a back window and begin a long cross-country journey, crossing an icy river and running through the snow towards Suffolk.

Meanwhile, Tibbs overhears Cruella ordering the Baddun brothers to kill the puppies that night out of fear the police will soon find them. In response, Tibbs helps the puppies escape through a hole in the wall, but the Baddun brothers notice and give chase. Pongo and Perdita break into the house and confront the Baddun brothers just as they are about to kill the puppies. While the adult dogs attack the two men, Colonel and Tibbs guide the puppies from the house. After a happy reunion with their own puppies, Pongo and Perdita discover there are 86 more puppies with them. Shocked at Cruella's plans, they decide to adopt all of them, certain that Roger and Anita would never reject them.

The Dalmatians start their homeward trek, pursued by the Baddun brothers. They take shelter from a blizzard in a dairy farm with a friendly collie and three cows, then make their way to Dinsford, where they meet a Black Labrador waiting for them in a blacksmith's shop. Cruella and the Baddun brothers arrive, prompting Pongo to have his entire family roll in a sooty fireplace to disguise themselves as other Labradors. The Labrador helps them board a moving van bound for London, but melting snow falls on Lucky and clears the soot off of him. Enraged, Cruella pursues the van in her car and rams it, but the Badduns, who try to cut it off from above, end up colliding with her. Both vehicles crash into a ditch. Cruella yells in frustration at the pair as the van drives off.

In London, a depressed Nanny and the Radcliffes try to enjoy Christmas, and the wealth they have acquired from the song about Cruella, which has become a big radio hit. The soot-covered Dalmatians suddenly flood the house. Upon removing the soot and counting the massive family of dogs, Roger chooses to use his songwriting royalties to buy a big house in the country so they can keep all 101 dalmatians.

Cast
 Rod Taylor as Pongo, Roger's pet, Perdita's mate, and the father of 15, and adopted father of the eighty-four orphaned puppies.
 Lisa Daniels and Cate Bauer as Perdita, Anita's pet, Pongo's mate, and the mother of 15 and adopted mother of 84 orphaned puppies. She is an amalgamation of the characters "Perdita" and "Missis" from the original novel.
 Betty Lou Gerson as Cruella de Vil, a spoiled heiress who "worships fur" and hates being denied or disobeyed. She drives a burgundy car similar to a Mercedes-Benz 500K Cabriolet. 
Gerson also voiced Miss Birdwell, a panelist on the show "What's My Crime?". 
Mary Wickes served as Cruella's live-action model.
 Ben Wright as Roger Radcliffe, Pongo's owner and Anita's husband. He works as a songwriter and later creates a hit song about Cruella de Vil, whom he dislikes and does not trust.
Bill Lee provided Roger's singing voice.
 Lisa Davis as Anita Radcliffe, Perdita's owner and Roger's wife. She is, like Perdita, a gentle person. She feels inclined to give Cruella the benefit of the doubt, as they went to school together.
Helene Stanley served as Anita's live-action model.
 Frederick Worlock as Horace Baddun, one of the Baddun brothers. Despite being less intelligent than his brother, he somehow figures out all the dogs' plots, but completely cowed by Jasper's overwhelming personality. He loves "What's My Crime?", a spoof of the then-popular TV gameshow What's My Line?.
Worlock also voiced Inspector Graves, a panelist on the show "What's My Crime?".
 J. Pat O'Malley as Jasper Baddun, one of the Baddun brothers. He is a fast talker and aggressive bully who completely disregards the possibility of intelligence in dogs. He also loves "What's My Crime?" and drives a brown van with loose/broken fenders.
O'Malley also voiced the Colonel, an Old English Sheepdog who is part of the Twilight Bark. He, Tibbs, and Captain allow the Dalmatian family to stay in their barn one night and attack the Badduns to buy Pongo and Perdy time to escape.
 Martha Wentworth as Nanny, the Radcliffes' elderly cook and housekeeper. She is very maternal and fussy, detests Cruella, and is very attached to the puppies. 
Wentworth also voiced Queenie, one of three cows who allow the puppies to stay in their barn and drink their milk.
Wentworth voiced Lucy the White Goose as well. Lucy is a friend of Old Towser.
 Thurl Ravenscroft as Captain, a gray horse who aids Pongo, Perdy, Sergeant Tibbs and Colonel. 
 David Frankham as Sergeant Tibbs, a tabby cat who is the first to discover the puppies' whereabouts and masterminds their escape from the Old de Vil Place.
 Mimi Gibson as Lucky, one of Pongo and Perdita's litter, who has a horseshoe of spots on his back. He loves watching TV and struggles the most on the journey home.
 Barbara Beaird as Rolly, a puppy who is always hungry and is shown as pudgier than the rest of the puppies. He even risks stealing food from Horace and is usually in some trouble. 
 Mickey Maga as Patch, a puppy who loves Thunderbolt and has a spot on his eye. Patch is often seen barking and growling at threats. He is the main character of 101 Dalmatians II: Patch's London Adventure.
 Sandra Abbott as Penny.
 Tudor Owen as Old Towser, a bloodhound who helps spread the news about the stolen puppies.
 George Pelling as Danny, a Great Dane who aids Pongo and Perdita and is one of the first dogs to answer Pongo's Twilight Bark message.
 Junius Matthews as Scottie, Danny's terrier friend.
 Queenie Leonard as Princess, one of the three cows who help the puppies.
 Marjorie Bennett as Duchess, one of the three cows who help the puppies.
 Barbara Luddy as Rover, one of the 84 Dalmatian puppies that Cruella bought.
 Rickie Sorensen as Spotty, one of the 84 Dalmatian puppies that Cruella bought.
 Tom Conway as the Collie, who offers the Dalmatians shelter for the night at a dairy farm. 
 Conway also voiced the Quizmaster, the host of "What's My Crime?".
 Ramsay Hill as the Labrador Retriever in Dinsford, who helps load the puppies into the moving van.
 Paul Wexler as the Mechanic who fixes the van.
 Basil Ruysdael as the driver of the moving van.
 Paul Frees as Dirty Dawson, the villain in the "Thunderbolt" TV show. Frees has no spoken dialogue in the film, only laughter.
 Lucille Bliss as TV Commercial Singer, who sings the "Kanine Krunchies" jingle.

Production

Story development
Dodie Smith wrote the book The Hundred and One Dalmatians in 1956. When Walt Disney read it in 1957, it immediately grabbed his attention, and he promptly obtained the rights. Smith had always secretly hoped that Disney would make it into a film. Disney assigned Bill Peet to write the story, which he did, marking the first time that the story for a Disney animated film was written by a single person. Writing in his autobiography, Peet was tasked by Disney to write a detailed screenplay first before storyboarding. Because Peet never learned to use a typewriter, he wrote the initial draft by hand on legal paper.

He condensed elements of the original book while enlarging others, some of which included eliminating Cruella's husband and cat, as well merging the two mother Dalmatians, birth mother Missis and adopted mother Perdita, into one character. Another notable character loss was Cadpig, the female runt of Pongo and Missis' puppies, whose traits were transferred between Lucky and the newly established Penny in the film (although it is never indicated outright that Cadpig was dropped); the Colonel's cat assistant was re-gendered from being a female by the name of Lieutenant Willow in the book, and Horace Baddun was renamed from Saul to presumably make him sound more akin in tone to Jasper. Bill Peet did retain a scene in which Pongo and Perdita exchange wedding vows in unison with their owners, by which the censor board warned that it might offend certain religious audiences if the animals repeated the exact words of a solemn religious ceremony. The scene was reworked to be less religious with Roger and Anita dressed in formal clothes.

Two months later, Peet completed the manuscript and had it typed up. Walt said the script was "great stuff" and commissioned Peet to begin storyboarding. Additionally, Peet was charged with recording the voice-over process. Although Disney had not been as involved in the production of the animated films as frequently as in previous years nevertheless, he was always present at story meetings. When Peet sent Dodie Smith some drawings of the characters, she wrote back saying that he had improved her story and that the designs looked better than the illustrations in the book.

Animation

Art direction
After Sleeping Beauty (1959) disappointed at the box-office, there was some talk of closing down the animation department at the Disney studio. During the production of it, Disney told animator Eric Larson: "I don't think we can continue; it's too expensive." Despite this, he still had deep feelings towards animation because he had built the company upon it.

Ub Iwerks, in charge of special processes at the studio, had been experimenting with Xerox photography to aid in animation. By 1959, he had modified a Xerox camera to transfer drawings by animators directly to animation cels, eliminating the inking process, thus saving time and money while preserving the spontaneity of the penciled elements. However, because of its limitations, the camera was unable to deviate from a black scratchy outline and lacked the fine lavish quality of hand inking. Disney would first use the Xerox process for a thorn forest in Sleeping Beauty, and the first production to make full use of the process was Goliath II. For One Hundred and One Dalmatians, one of the benefits of the process was that it was a great help towards animating the spotted dogs. According to Chuck Jones, Disney was able to complete the film for about half of what it would have cost if they had had to animate all the dogs and spots.

Ken Anderson proposed the use of the Xerox on Dalmatians to Walt, who was disenchanted with animation by then, and replied "Ah, yeah, yeah, you can fool around all you want to". For the stylized art direction, Anderson took inspiration from British cartoonist Ronald Searle, who once advised him to use a Mont Blanc pen and India ink for his artwork. In addition to the character animation, Anderson also sought to use Xerography on "the background painting because I was going to apply the same technique to the whole picture." Along with color stylist Walt Peregoy, the two had the line drawings be printed on a separate animation cel before being laid over the background, which gave the appearance similar to the Xeroxed animation. Disney disliked the artistic look of the film and felt he was losing the "fantasy" element of his animated films. In a meeting with Anderson and the animation staff concerning future films, Walt said, "We're never gonna have one of those goddamned things" referring to Dalmatians and its technique, and stated, "Ken's never going to be an art director again."

Ken Anderson took this to heart, but Walt eventually forgave him on his final trip to the studio in late 1966. As Anderson recalled in an interview:

He looked very sick. I said, "Gee, it's great to see you, Walt," and he said, "You know that thing you did on Dalmatians." He didn't say anything else, but he just gave me this look, and I knew that all was forgiven and in his opinion, maybe what I did on Dalmatians wasn't so bad. That was the last time I ever saw him. Then, a few weeks later, I learned he was gone.

Live-action reference
As with the previous Disney films, actors provided live-action reference in order to determine what would work before the animation process begun. Actress Helene Stanley performed the live-action reference for the character of Anita. She did the same work for the characters of Cinderella and Princess Aurora in Sleeping Beauty. Meanwhile, Mary Wickes provided the live-action reference for Cruella de Vil.

Character animation
Marc Davis was the sole animator on Cruella De Vil. During production, Davis claimed her character was partly inspired by Bette Davis (no relation), Rosalind Russell, and Tallulah Bankhead. He took further influence from her voice actress, Betty Lou Gerson, whose cheekbones he added to the character. He later complimented, "[t]hat [her] voice was the greatest thing I've ever had a chance to work with. A voice like Betty Lou's gives you something to do. You get a performance going there, and if you don't take advantage of it, you're off your rocker". While her hair coloring originated from the illustrations in the novel, Davis found its disheveled style by looking "through old magazines for hairdos from 1940 till now". Her coat was exaggerated to match her oversized personality, and the lining was red because "there's a devil image involved".

Casting
Before starring in high-profile roles such as The Birds and The Time Machine, Australian actor Rod Taylor had extensive radio experience and then was cast as Pongo. The filmmakers deliberately cast dogs with deeper voices than their human owners, so they had more power. Walt Disney originally had Lisa Davis read for the role of Cruella De Vil, but she did not think that she was right for the part, and wanted to try reading the role of Anita. Disney agreed with her after the two of them read the script for a second time.

Betty Lou Gerson, who was previously the narrator for Cinderella, auditioned for the role of Cruella De Vil in front of Marc Davis and sequence director Wolfgang Reitherman, and landed it. While searching for the right accent of the character, Gerson landed on a "phony theatrical voice, someone who's set sail from New York but hasn't quite reached England". During the recording process, she was thought to be imitating Tallulah Bankhead. However, Gerson disputed, "Well, I didn't intentionally imitate her...I was raised in Birmingham, Ala., and Tallulah was from Jasper, Ala. We both had phony English accents on top of our Southern accents and a great deal of flair. So our voices came out that way". In addition to voicing Mrs. Birdwell, Gerson finished recording in fourteen days.

Music

To have music involved in the narrative, Peet used an old theater trick by which the protagonist is a down-and-out songwriter. However, unlike the previous animated Disney films at the time, the songs were not composed by a team, but by Mel Leven who composed both lyrics and music. Previously, Leven had composed songs for the UPA animation studio in which animators, who transferred to work at Disney, had recommended him to Walt. His first assignment was to compose "Cruella de Vil," of which Leven composed three versions. The final version used in the film was composed as a "bluesy number" before a meeting with Walt in forty-five minutes.

The other two songs included in the film are "Kanine Krunchies Jingle" (sung by Lucille Bliss, who voiced Anastasia Tremaine in Disney's 1950 film Cinderella), and "Dalmatian Plantation" in which Roger sings only two lines at its closure. Leven had also written additional songs that were not included in the film. The first song, "Don't Buy a Parrot from a Sailor," a cockney chant, was meant to be sung by Jasper and Horace at the De Vil Mansion. A second song, "Cheerio, Good-Bye, Toodle-oo, Hip Hip!" was to be sung by the dalmatian puppies as they make their way into London. A third song titled "March of the One Hundred and One" was meant for the dogs to sing after escaping Cruella by van. Different, longer versions of "Kanine Krunchies Jingle" and "Dalmatian Plantation" appear on the Disneyland Records read-along album based on the film.

The Sherman Brothers wrote a title song, "One Hundred and One Dalmatians", but it was not used in the film. The song has been released on other Disney recordings, however.

Release
One Hundred and One Dalmatians was first released in theaters on January 25, 1961. The film was re-released theatrically in 1969, 1979, 1985, and 1991. The 1991 reissue was the 20th highest-grossing film of the year for domestic earnings.

Home media
One Hundred and One Dalmatians was first released on VHS on April 10, 1992, as part of the Walt Disney Classics video series. By June 1992, it had sold 11.1 million copies. At the time, it was the sixth best-selling video of all time. It was re-released on March 9, 1999, as part of the Walt Disney Masterpiece Collection video series. Due to technical issues, it was later released on LaserDisc and was delayed numerous times before its release on DVD. The film was re-released on VHS, and for the first time on DVD, in December 1999, as a Walt Disney Limited Issue for a limited 60-day time period before going into moratorium. A two-disc Platinum Edition DVD was released on March 4, 2008. It was released on Blu-ray Disc in the United Kingdom on September 3, 2012. A Diamond Edition Blu-ray of the film was released in North America on February 10, 2015. A Limited Edition from Disney Movie Club was released on Blu-ray and DVD combo on November 6, 2018. Then it was re-released on HD digital download and Blu-ray on September 24, 2019, as part of the Walt Disney Signature Collection.

Reception

Box office
During its initial theatrical run, the film grossed $14 million in the United States and Canada, which generated $6.2 million in distributor rentals. It was also the most popular film of the year in France, with admissions of 14.7 million ranking tenth on their all-time list.

The film was re-released in 1969, where it earned $15 million. In its 1979 theatrical re-release, it grossed $19 million, and in 1985, the film grossed $32 million. During its fourth re-release in 1991, it grossed $60.8 million.

Prior to 1995, the film had grossed $86 million overseas. In 1995, it grossed $71 million overseas bringing its international total to $157 million. The film's total domestic lifetime gross is $145 million, and its total worldwide gross is $303 million. Adjusted for inflation, and incorporating subsequent releases, the film has a lifetime gross of $900.3 million.

Critical reaction
In its initial release, the film received acclaim from critics, many of whom hailed it as the studio's best release since Snow White and the Seven Dwarfs (1937) and the closest to a real "Disney" film in many years. Howard Thompson of The New York Times wrote, "While the story moves steadily toward a stark, melodramatic "chase" climax, it remains enclosed in a typical Disney frame of warm family love, human and canine". However, he later opined that the "[s]ongs are scarce, too. A few more would have braced the final starkness". Variety claimed that "While not as indelibly enchanting or inspired as some of the studio's most unforgettable animated endeavors, this is nonetheless a painstaking creative effort". Time praised the film as "the wittiest, most charming, least pretentious cartoon feature Walt Disney has ever made". Harrison's Reports felt all children and adults will be "highly entertained by Walt Disney's latest, a semi-sophisticated, laugh-provoking, all cartoon, feature-lengther in Technicolor." Dodie Smith also enjoyed the film where she particularly praised the animation and backgrounds of the film.

Contemporary reviews have remained positive. Reviewing the film during its 1991 re-release, Roger Ebert of the Chicago Sun-Times, while giving the film three stars out of four, asserted that "it's an uneven film, with moments of inspiration in a fairly conventional tale of kidnapping and rescue. This is not one of the great Disney classics - it's not in the same league with Snow White or Pinocchio - but it's passable fun, and will entertain its target family audiences." Chicago Tribune film critic Gene Siskel, in his 1991 review, also gave the film three stars out of four. Ralph Novak of People wrote "What it lacks in romantic extravagance and plush spectacle, this 1961 Disney film makes up for in quiet charm and subtlety. In fact, if any movie with dogs, cats, and horses who talk can be said to belong in the realm of realistic drama, this is it". However, the film did receive a few negative reviews. In 2011, Craig Berman of MSNBC ranked it and its 1996 remake as two of the worst children's films of all time, saying that, "The plot itself is a bit nutty. Making a coat out of dogs? Who does that? But worse than Cruella de Vil's fashion sense is the fact that your children will definitely start asking for a Dalmatian of their own for their next birthday".

The website's critical consensus reads, "With plenty of pooches and a memorable villain (Cruella De Vil), this is one of Disney's most enduring, entertaining animated films."

Cruella de Vil ranked 39th on AFI's list of "100 Years...100 Heroes and Villains".

Legacy

Live-action remake and its sequel
Since the original release of the film, Disney has taken the property in various directions. The earliest of these endeavors was the 1996 live-action remake, 101 Dalmatians, which starred Glenn Close as Cruella De Vil. Unlike the original film, none of the animals had speaking voices in this version. Its success in theaters led to 102 Dalmatians, released on November 22, 2000.

TV series
After the first live-action version of the film, an animated series titled 101 Dalmatians: The Series was launched. The characters' designs were stylized further to allow for economic animation and to appeal to contemporary trends.

101 Dalmatian Street is the second TV series with a plot in the 21st century, with a new art style and a concept loosely based on the source material. Set 60 years after the original animated film, the show focuses on Dylan and Dolly, (who are both descendants of Pongo and Perdita) caring for their 97 younger siblings who all live without a human in Camden Town.

Sequel
101 Dalmatians II: Patch's London Adventure, the official sequel to the original animated film, was released direct-to-video on January 21, 2003.

Live-action reboot

In 2021, Disney released another live-action film that focuses on the origin of Cruella de Vil. Emma Stone plays Cruella and Alex Timbers was in negotiations to direct the film, but he left directing duties for Cruella due to scheduling conflicts and was replaced by the I, Tonya director Craig Gillespie in December 2018. Emma Thompson portrays Baroness von Hellman, while Paul Walter Hauser joined the project, revealed to be as Horace, with Joel Fry cast as Jasper. The film was originally scheduled to be released on December 23, 2020, but was delayed to May 28, 2021.

See also
 List of highest-grossing animated films
 List of highest-grossing films in France
 List of American films of 1961
 List of animated feature films of the 1960s
 List of Walt Disney Pictures films
 List of Disney theatrical animated features

Notes

References

External links

 
 
 
 
 
 

101 Dalmatians films
1960s American animated films
1960s children's adventure films
1960s children's animated films
1960s children's comedy films
1961 adventure films
1961 animated films
1961 comedy films
1961 films
1960s English-language films
American adventure comedy films
American children's animated adventure films
American children's animated comedy films
American animated feature films
Animated films about dogs
Films about pets
Animated films based on children's books
Animated films based on novels
Animated films set in London
Children's comedy-drama films
Animated films about families
Films adapted into comics
Films adapted into television shows
Films based on British novels
Films directed by Clyde Geronimi
Films directed by Hamilton Luske
Films directed by Wolfgang Reitherman
Films produced by Walt Disney
Films scored by George Bruns
Films set in abandoned houses
Films set in country houses
Films set in Suffolk
Rotoscoped films
Walt Disney Animation Studios films
Walt Disney Pictures animated films